His Ward's Love is a 1909 American Short film directed by D. W. Griffith and the film was made by the American Mutoscope and Biograph Company.

Cast
 Arthur V. Johnson as Reverend Howson
 Florence Lawrence as The Reverend's Ward
 Owen Moore as General Winthrop
 Linda Arvidson as The Maid

Storyline
Reverend Howson loves his young ward, but urges her to marry someone else. She accepts the proposal, but then sees the Reverend kissing an object she has dropped, and realizes he loves her.

See also
 List of American films of 1909
 D. W. Griffith filmography

References

External links

1909 films
American silent short films
Films directed by D. W. Griffith
1909 short films
American black-and-white films
1900s American films